Herbert Rudley (March 22, 1910 – September 9, 2006) was an American character actor who appeared on stage, films and on television.

Early life
Rudley was born in 1910 in Philadelphia and attended Temple University. He left Temple after winning a scholarship to Eva Le Gallienne's Civic Repertory Theatre.

Stage
Rudley first appeared on stage in 1926 and had his Broadway debut in 1931, appearing in Did I Say No. Other Broadway credits include How Long Till Summer (1949), Sons and Soldiers (1942), Macbeth (1941), Eight O'Clock Tuesday (1940), Another Sun (1939), The World We Make (1939), The Eternal Road (1936), Battle Hymn (1935), Mother (1935), The Threepenny Opera (1932) and We, the People (1932). He also appeared in Abe Lincoln in Illinois.

Rudley and Keenan Wynn joined forces in the mid-1940s to create Players Production, a small theater venue in Los Angeles with the goal of presenting revivals of plays.

Rudley was also a playwright who, along with Fanya Lawrence, created the farce Adam Ate the Apple.

Film
In 1940 Rudley appeared in the film version of Abe Lincoln in Illinois. For the next four decades he appeared in dozens of supporting film roles, including The Seventh Cross (1944) and Rhapsody in Blue (1945), a fictionalized biography of George Gershwin in which he portrayed Ira Gershwin. He appeared in A Walk in the Sun (1945) as a World War II U.S. Army sergeant who experiences a psychological breakdown in combat, Joan of Arc (1948) and The Young Lions (1958) in which he played an unsympathetic U.S. Army captain.

Rudley played a doctor who resuscitates a presumably executed convict in Decoy, and conversely played a nearly executed doctor who is thought dead and resuscitated by Basil Rathbone in The Black Sleep.

Television
On television, Rudley appeared both in dramas, often as military men, and comedies. He appeared on seven episodes of the CBS series "You Are There" hosted by Walter Cronkite.  He also appeared on My Friend Flicka. 

In 1956, he guest starred as “Captain Starr”, an inexperienced US Cavalry Captain fooled into searching Pawnee Indians (when white men committed the crimes) on Gunsmoke in S2E11’s “No Indians”. 

In 1957, he guest starred as a Prussian cavalry officer in an episode of the syndicated western series, Boots and Saddles. 

In 1957, he appeared in the role of Sam Brennan in some early episodes of NBC's western drama, The Californians, set in the San Francisco gold rush of the 1850s. That same year he guest starred as “Emmett Egan”, a rich man who was bored with life so he tried to pay Matt Dillon to quit so he could become Marshall of Dodge City on Gunsmoke in “The Man Who Would Be Marshal” (S2E37).

He made four guest appearances on Perry Mason between 1958-1962 including the part of murderer George Durrell in 1958’s “The Case of the Prodigal Parent” and as Edward Nelson in the 1960 episode "The Case of the Gallant Grafter". He was one of only eleven actors to play all three pivotal roles in Perry Mason episodes—victim, defendant and murderer.

In 1959, he appeared as John McAuliffe on Border Patrol and as Col. Sam Percy on Maverick. He guest starred twice as Jeremy Thorne in NBC's western series Laramie. In the sixties he co-starred in two short-lived NBC half-hours, the drama, "Michael Shayne" with Richard Denning in 1960-61 and the Juliet Prowse  comedy  Mona McCluskey in 1965-66. In 1963, he appeared in two episodes of The Beverly Hillbillies. Also that year, he played the part of an overbearing father in "The All-Night Party" episode of Leave it to Beaver.

In 1973, Rudley guest starred in one episode of Griff.
From 1967 through 1969 he co-starred as Herb Hubbard for two seasons on NBC-TV's The Mothers-in-Law with Eve Arden and Kaye Ballard.  In 1981, he made four appearances on Dallas as Howard Barker, an attorney who represented J.R. Ewing in his divorce and child custody fight with his former wife, Sue Ellen.

Personal life
During the 1970's Rudley owned and operated a small gift shop in the Marina Del Rey shopping mall.

Rudley was first married to Ann Loring. They had a son, Stephen.

Death
Rudley died in 2006, aged 96, from a heart attack.

Filmography

References

InterviewsScary Monsters Magazine (January 2008) no. 65 "The Black Sleep: An Interview With Herbert Rudley" Interview by Lawrence Fultz Jr.Monster Bash Magazine (2006) no. 5 "On The Set of The Black Sleep''" Interview by Lawrence Fultz, Jr.

External links
Variety.com obituary

1910 births
2006 deaths
Male actors from Philadelphia
American male stage actors
American male film actors
American male television actors
Male actors from Los Angeles
20th-century American male actors